Peter Goddard  (born 3 September 1945) is a British mathematical physicist who works in string theory and conformal field theory.  Among his many contributions to these fields is the Goddard–Thorn theorem (proved together with Charles Thorn).

Biography
Goddard was educated at Emanuel School and the University of Cambridge, where he was a professor in the Department of Applied Mathematics and Theoretical Physics (DAMTP), and founding deputy director of the Isaac Newton Institute for Mathematical Sciences. He was Master of St John's College from 1994 until 2004. He was Director of the Institute for Advanced Study from January 2004 through June 2012. He is now a professor in the Institute's School of Natural Sciences.

He was elected to the Royal Society in 1989, was awarded the Dirac Medal and Medal of the International Centre for Theoretical Physics in 1997, and was made a Commander of the Order of the British Empire in 2002.

References

1945 births
Living people
20th-century British mathematicians
21st-century British mathematicians
Academics of the University of Cambridge
British string theorists
Commanders of the Order of the British Empire
Fellows of the Royal Society
Directors of the Institute for Advanced Study
Trustees of the Institute for Advanced Study
Institute for Advanced Study faculty
Masters of St John's College, Cambridge
Cambridge mathematicians
People educated at Emanuel School